Namino may refer to:

Namino, Kumamoto, a former village in Aso District, Kumamoto Prefecture, Japan
Namino Station, a railway station in Aso, Kumamoto, Japan

People with the surname
, Japanese actress

Japanese-language surnames